Lyor Cohen born October 3, 1959) is an American record executive and entrepreneur. Cohen has been actively involved in hip hop at various record labels for more than 30 years. He started by managing rappers for Rush Productions, then led Def Jam. After Def Jam, Cohen took on a leadership role at Warner Music Group. In September 2012, Cohen resigned from Warner and started his own independent label, 300 Entertainment. On September 28, 2016, Cohen was named YouTube's Global Head of Music.

Early life
Born in New York to Israeli immigrants in 1959,  Cohen grew up in Los Angeles. In 1981, he earned a degree in global marketing and finance from the University of Miami School of Business at the University of Miami. 

After graduating from the University of Miami, he worked briefly in the Beverly Hills office of Bank Leumi.

Music career

Rush Productions / Rush Artist Management
Late in 1984, after promoting a pair of rock and rap shows at The Mix Club in Hollywood (one featured Run-DMC, the other featured Whodini), Cohen moved to New York to take a job at Simmons' Rush Productions (later called Rush Artist Management). Beginning as Run-DMC's road manager, Cohen quickly began taking on additional responsibilities, working on behalf of an artist roster that included Kurtis Blow, Whodini, Run-DMC, LL Cool J, the Beastie Boys, and Public Enemy. By 1987, Cohen himself was signing artists to Rush. These acts included Slick Rick, DJ Jazzy Jeff & the Fresh Prince, Eric B. & Rakim, EPMD, Stetsasonic, De La Soul, and A Tribe Called Quest.

Cohen credits Jam Master Jay with teaching him the basics of the music business. "[Jay] showed me how to settle shows and fulfill my responsibilities to the group," Cohen told Vibe magazine. "It's those lessons that I rely on daily to do what I do now." Before long, according to Rolling Stone, Cohen "became known for his no-nonsense approach to business, his negotiating skill, his ability to forward the plot". It was Cohen who brokered Run-DMC's endorsement deal with Adidas, "one of the first big commercial deals for a rap group". This deal was followed by others that paired up Jazzy Jeff & the Fresh Prince with Le Coq Sportif, LL Cool J with Troop sportswear, and Run-DMC with New Coke.

By 1989, Rush—under Cohen's leadership—was recognized as "the premier management operation" in the Rap field. Steve Stoute, in The Tanning of America, credits Cohen with "[believing] early on in the cultural melting pot that was being brewed for and by the younger generation". In his own words, Lyor Cohen has said, "I was determined to prove people wrong, to prove to the gatekeepers of the industry that we had a place here and we weren't going to relinquish our opportunity."

From artist development to label executive
Cohen began transitioning from artist management to the label side of the music business in 1989, when he and Simmons formed Rush Associated Labels. The goal was to capitalize on the ability of established recording artists to sniff out new talent by signing boutique label deals with them. It paid off most notably with Jam Master Jay's JMJ Records, which brought Onyx to Def Jam in 1992 and Jayo Felony in 1994. By then Cohen was starting to groom a new generation of executives, notably Chris Lighty, Julie Greenwald, Kevin Liles, Todd Moscowitz, and Mike Kyser.

In 1994 Cohen teamed up with Simmons to negotiate Def Jam's departure from Sony (which had been distributing Def Jam since 1985) for a new home at PolyGram. By then, having become Simmons's partner in the label several years earlier, Cohen was running Def Jam day-to-day. (Rick Rubin, Def Jam's founder, had left Def Jam in 1988.)

Def Jam under PolyGram and Universal
Under PolyGram and Cohen's leadership, Def Jam prospered. Cohen worked with a brand-new roster of successful rappers, like Redman, Method Man, Jay-Z, DMX, Ja Rule and Ludacris. Concurrently, Cohen oversaw custom label deals with Roc-A-Fella Records, Murder Inc., and Disturbing Tha Peace.

In 1998, PolyGram was purchased by Seagram, and merged into Universal.

The Island Def Jam Music Group
In June 1998, after PolyGram's merger with Universal Music and its MCA-related label group, Island, Mercury, and Def Jam were merged into a new unit called the Island Def Jam Music Group. Cohen was named co-president. In the process, he became (as he himself noted) "the first Hip-Hop president in charge of a major label".

This promotion required Cohen to expand his portfolio to include artists who didn't rap, among them Bon Jovi, Mariah Carey, Shania Twain, Elvis Costello, Ashanti, Nickelback, Slipknot, Sum 41, The Killers, and Slayer. In 2001, Cohen was involved in Island Def Jam's purchase of Roadrunner, a heavy-metal label, as well as the deal to distribute Rick Rubin's American. In 2002, American released Johnny Cash's American IV: The Man Comes Around. The last album released by Cash before his death, it included Cash's hit version of Trent Reznor's "Hurt".

Warner Music Group
In January 2004, Cohen left Island Def Jam for a position with the Edgar Bronfman Jr. investor group-financed Warner, which was subsequently spun off from Time Warner. Ultimately, Cohen was named WMG's chairman and chief executive.

By 2006, the positive effects of Cohen's leadership were encapsulated in a story for the Los Angeles Times, which noted: "Under Cohen, Warner Music has thrived, due in part to the executive's innovative initiatives, such as an incubator program that builds relationships with independent label executives the company aspires to hire." Warner's success with Mike Jones and the rock band Paramore both grew out of the incubator program.

At Warner, Cohen oversaw the merger of the Atlantic and Elektra labels into Atlantic, and placed Julie Greenwald, his protégée, into a top executive position there. In 2009, Cohen elevated Greenwald to chairman and chief operating officer of Atlantic, a promotion that established Greenwald as the highest-ranking woman executive at an American record company. Greenwald's successes at Atlantic have included The Black Keys, Bruno Mars, Death Cab for Cutie, Jason Mraz, Kid Rock, Lupe Fiasco, Plies, T.I., and Wiz Khalifa.

YouTube and Spotify
In September 2006, Cohen oversaw an agreement with YouTube that allowed the site to show videos by Warner artists in exchange for a share of YouTube's advertising revenue. According to The New York Times, the deal marked "the first time a major record company [had] licensed content to YouTube". In 2011, Cohen oversaw an agreement on behalf of the Warner roster with Spotify, the digital music service. Eventually, Cohen oversaw all of Warner's digital initiatives.

Departure from Warner
In September 2012 Cohen resigned from Warner where he served as one of their dominant creative executives.

Future ventures and 300
There was much speculation about Cohen's next move.  Cohen's own assessment of his career was broadly predictive. "I've been an outsider in the traditional record industry for more than 25 years," he told the Los Angeles Times. "I'm an entrepreneur, so I encourage risk-taking. And the only way to encourage risk-taking is to take risks yourself, which means sometimes you'll fail, or people will say you are too aggressive or controversial. But someone needs to jump into the pool first for a party to get really great. I've always been willing to be that guy." In November 2013, Cohen revealed he was starting a new company named "300", after the 300 Spartan Warriors who fought the famous war against the Persians seen in the movie 300. He stated the company would be part record label, part marketing company, part distributor, with major backing from Google and Atlantic.

Joining YouTube
In September 2016, Google's YouTube announced Lyor would be joining the organization as Global Head of Music. He officially joined the company in December 2016. He wrote a public letter stating some of his goals and aspirations for his new role. He will strive to enable the music industry to adopt new business models that take advantage of technological advances.

Philanthropy and leadership
Cohen is currently on the board of the Rock and Roll Hall of Fame, and is an acting Director for the New York-based charitable organization Boys & Girls Harbor.

Personal life
Some of Cohen's closest associates have included his longtime friend and business partner Russell Simmons, Jay Z, music executive Julie Greenwald, Jon Bon Jovi, and Kanye West, who dubbed himself "the Lyor Cohen of Dior Homme" on a 2010 recording Devil in a New Dress.

Cohen met his first wife, E.K. Smith, during the recording of the music video for "(You Gotta) Fight for Your Right (To Party!)" by the Beastie Boys.  Their wedding on April 1, 1988, was held in Sosua, Dominican Republic and is written about in Flava Flav's book.
Cohen's marriage to his second wife, Amy, ended in divorce in 2006. They have a daughter, Bea, and a son, Az. Cohen credits Az, along with a personal friend, with saving his life when Cohen experienced a pulmonary embolism during N.W.A's induction into the Rock and Roll Hall of Fame at Brooklyn's Barclays Center in April 2016.

In August 2016, Cohen remarried, wedding art world personality Xin Li, a Chinese former basketball player and model who is currently the deputy chairman of Christie's Asia.

Controversy

Murder Inc. Records raid
In January of 2003 the offices of Murder Inc. Records at Island Def Jam were raided by a joint task force of the NYPD and the FBI as part of a federal probe of label founder Irv Gotti's ties to drug lord Kenneth "Supreme" McGriff. Of particular interest to authorities was an Island Def Jam payment of $500,000 to a company fronted by McGriff. In 2005, Gotti was acquitted of all charges, as was Cohen, who had also testified.

TVT Records lawsuit

In 2002, Cohen was personally sued for fraud, tortious interference, breach of contract and copyright infringement by TVT Records as part of a larger action against Island Def Jam Music Group and Universal Music Group. The suit alleged that Cohen tried to hinder the production and release of an album by Ja Rule's group, the Cash Money Click. Initially, the defendants were ordered to pay TVT $132 million in compensatory and punitive damages, with $56 million due personally from Cohen. On appeal that figure was substantially reduced. Ultimately, TVT was awarded $126,720 for a breach of contract claim.

Further reading
Talking trash, making cash, and still able to sign Mariah. Profile at The New York Times
 Musical Marvel The New York Post

References

External links

Lyor Cohen biography at Warner Music Group Corporate Site.
Lyor Cohen Bio and Interview at AskMen.com

1959 births
Israeli Jews
American music industry executives
American music managers
American people of Israeli descent
Living people
Businesspeople from Los Angeles
People from New York City
University of Miami Business School alumni
Businesspeople from New York City